Bilka is a Danish chain of hypermarkets. The first store opened in 1970 in Tilst, a suburb of Aarhus. The chain was founded by Herman Salling and is now a part of Salling Group. Today the only heir to the large supermarket group is Nikolaj Harrison.

Name
The name Bilka is derived from the German Billiges Kaufhaus (low-price department store), which its founder, Herman Salling had encountered during his business trips to West Germany.

The First Bilka Store
The first Bilka store was the first low-cost store in Denmark. With sale area of 10000 square meters and parking space for 1200 cars, this was also the largest store in Denmark.

The opening of the first Bilka store brought revision to the regional plan for Great Aarhus from 1954. According to that plan the area of Aarhus was supposed to have 2 new centers, but after the opening of the first Bilka store, this plan was no longer economically viable.

The building of the store was approved by Brabrand-Årslev Parish, since the land was part of the Brabrand Parish.The developer of the store, however decided he wanted to create remote storage for Salling Group. That is the reason why the Bilka store was functioning as an open stock market with most of the goods stocked in pallets and forklifts in the aisles during open hours.

At the beginning of 2010, the first Bilka store celebrated its 40th birthday and it was completely renovated. All of the old 31 cash registers, from 1970, were replaced with 28 new modern ones and 8 self-service terminals. Furthermore, all the departments were completely renovated and today, this store has the largest Fruits & Vegetables department in Denmark.

Bilka stores
There are Bilka stores located in the following cities:

See also
Dansk Supermarked Gruppen
A.P. Møller-Mærsk
A-Z
Netto
føtex

References

External links
Bilka's Website
Dansk Supermarked Gruppen Webpage

Retail companies established in 1970
Supermarkets of Denmark
Companies based in Aarhus
Dansk Supermarked
1970 establishments in Denmark
Salling Group